Gombak is a town (Malay: pekan, bandar kecil Gombak) and locality in the mukim of Setapak in the coterminous Gombak District, Selangor, Malaysia.

History
Gombak was first established in the 1800s by the Minangkabau immigrants with the consent of the Sultan of Selangor.

Geography
The town is situated alongside Jalan Gombak, in the northeastern fringes of Kuala Lumpur, just across the border from Wangsa Maju. Other adjacent towns include Ulu Klang, Ampang and Batu Caves.

Gombak town is located in Selangor but a small fraction of the town spills into the Federal Territory of Kuala Lumpur.

Postcodes for this town are 53100, 53000,and 68100.

Gombak town is administered by both Majlis Perbandaran Selayang (Selangor side) and Dewan Bandaraya Kuala Lumpur (Kuala Lumpur side).

Transportation

Public transport
Gombak station is the first station of the line.

Car
MRR2 Federal Route 28 runs through much of Gombak town.

Gombak is also notable for being the starting point of the East Coast Expressway (Lebuhraya Pantai Timur) .

Residential areas
Gombak consists of many villages and housing area including:

 Batu 3 1/2 - Pahang Border
 Taman Desa Gombak
 Kampung Puah Asal
 Kampung Puah Lembah
 Kampung Sungai Merali
 Kampung Kuantan
 Kampung Banda Dalam
 Kampung Padang Balang
 Setapak Garden
 Taman Ibukota
 Taman Medan Idaman
 Kampung Sungai Mulia
 Kampung Lee Kong Chian
 Kampung Kerdas
 Kampung Changkat
 Gombak Setia
 Taman Perwira
 Taman Setia
 Taman Perwira Indah
 Taman Harmonis
 Taman Bukit Sentosa
 Kampung Tengah
 Taman Bukit Lela
 Kampung Simpang 3
 Taman Berlian
 Taman Sahabat
 Taman Desa Minang
 Taman Melewar
 Taman Rowther
 Kampung Lembah Melewar
 Taman Koperasi Polis (1)
 Taman Changkat Desa
 Taman Greenwood
 Taman Greenwood Indah
 Kampung Sungai Chinchin
 Kampung Sungai Pusu
 Taman Villa Bestari
 Taman Desa Gemilang
 Kampung Sungai Salak
 Taman Rawiyah Sulaiman Jaya
 Taman Desa Makmur
 Kampung Bukit Kala
 Kampung Sungai Rumput

Gombak District
Towns in Selangor